No Word From Tom is the third album from indie folk band Hem.  Released on February 7, 2006, it features covers, live songs, and new recordings from the band.

Track listing 
All songs written by Dan Messé, except where noted.
 "All the Pretty Horses" (Traditional) - 0:30
 "Rainy Night in Georgia" (Tony Joe White) - 4:30 
 "Radiation Vibe" (Chris Collingwood, Adam Schlesinger) - 3:45
 "The Present" - 4:46 
 "Cincinnati Traveler" (Steve Curtis) - 1:02 
 "Betting on Trains" - 3:49 
 "So. Central Rain" (Berry, Buck, Mills, Stipe) - 3:10 
 "Tennessee Waltz" (Pee Wee King, Redd Stewart) - 2:46
 "Sailor" - 3:35
 "Eveningland" - 2:11 
 "Idle (The Rabbit Song)" - 3:42 
 "Crazy Arms" (Ralph Mooney and Charles Seals) - 2:24 
 "Oh No" (Gary Maurer, Messé) - 2:11 
 "All That I'm Good For" - 3:34  
 "The City and the Traveler" - 1:03 
 "Lazy Eye" (Gary Maurer, Messé) - 2:34 
 "The Beautiful Sea" - 2:40 
 "The Golden Day Is Dying" (Traditional) - 2:46

Personnel 
Sally Ellyson - vocals 
Dan Messé - piano, accordion, glockenspiel 
Gary Maurer - guitar, mandolin 
Steve Curtis - guitar, mandolin, banjo, back-up vocals 
George Rush - bass guitar
Mark Brotter - drums 
Bob Hoffnar - pedal steel guitar
Heather Zimmerman - violin

References

2006 albums
Hem (band) albums
Nettwerk Records albums